The Bank Job is a 2008 heist thriller film directed by Roger Donaldson, written by Dick Clement and Ian La Frenais, and starring Jason Statham, based on the 1971 Baker Street robbery in central London, from which the money and valuables stolen were never recovered. The producers allege that the story was prevented from being told in 1971 because of a D-Notice, to protect a prominent member of the British royal family. According to the producers, this film is intended to reveal the truth for the first time, although it includes significant elements of fiction.

The premiere was held in London on 18 February 2008, and it was released in the UK on 29 February 2008 and in the US on 7 March 2008. It received mostly positive reviews from critics and grossed $66 million worldwide.

Plot
In 1971, British Security Services (MI5) have taken interest in a safety deposit box that is located in a Lloyd's Bank branch on the corner of Baker Street and Marylebone Road. It belongs to a black militant gangster, Michael X, and contains compromising photos of Princess Margaret, which he is keeping as insurance to keep the British authorities off his back. Martine Love, an ex-model who is romantically involved with MI5 agent Tim Everett, is caught at Heathrow Airport smuggling drugs into the country, and to avoid going to jail, she makes a deal with the authorities whereby she agrees to retrieve the photos.

Martine approaches her friend Terry, a struggling East London car salesman with criminal contacts, and tells him that if he can assemble the gang to help her rob the bank, he will be richly rewarded, though she does not tell him about the photos in the deposit box. Terry recruits a small team, including Eddie (one of his own workers), Dave, Kevin, Bambas, and Guy Singer.  While scouting the bank, Dave runs into local gangster Lew Vogel, for whom he made several pornographic films.

The gang rents a leather goods shop near the bank and tunnels into the vault.  They loot the safety deposit boxes, but Terry becomes suspicious when Martine seems to display particular interest in one box and eventually discovers the photos. The police are alerted to the robbery by a ham radio operator who overhears the gang's walkie-talkie communications, but by the time they locate the bank, the gang has already fled. The robbery rattles many important underworld figures who had used the bank, including Lew Vogel, who kept a ledger of police payoffs inside.  He notifies a furious Michael X in Trinidad, who correctly suspects Gale Benson— the lover of his associate Hakim Jamal—of spying for MI5, and subsequently murders her. Vogel decides that Dave’s presence outside that particular bank was not a coincidence, and has him kidnapped and tortured for information by sand blasting an ankle and one of his legs. Dave gives in, and Lew has Gerald Pyke and Nick Burton--two corrupt policemen working on his payroll--kidnap Eddie at Terry's garage. Meanwhile, Terry discovers explicit photographs of important government officials among their loot and uses them to secure passports and new identities for the gang.

Vogel's men track down and murder Bambas and Guy Singer. Eddie refuses to cooperate with Vogel, who has Gerald execute Dave and threatens to kill Eddie unless Terry delivers the ledger to him; Terry agrees to meet up with Vogel at Paddington Station to exchange the ledger for Eddie. He arranges for the meeting to happen at the same time as he will be picking up the new passports and immunity from prosecution for the robbery from MI5 in exchange for the pictures of Princess Margaret. Meanwhile, Terry sends Kevin to honest cop Roy Given with a page torn from the ledger. Vogel becomes spooked and tries to flee, but Terry attacks and beats him—only to be arrested by the police. However, Given has Terry released and uses the information he supplied to arrest Lew, Gerald and Nick. In Trinidad, Michael X is arrested as well and after Benson's body is found in a shallow grave his house is burned down. Eddie inherits Terry's car dealership, while Kevin and Martine prepare to begin new lives with their share of the money. Terry and his family leave England and enjoy a carefree life on a boat in a sunny location.

It is later revealed Vogel's ledger eventually causes Scotland Yard to undergo a major corruption purge in the police force. The activities of Sonia Bern's brothels make several senior officials resign. Michael X is hanged in Trinidad in 1975 for the murder of Gale Benson and his file in the British National Archive remains classified until 2054. Lew Vogel is sentenced to 8 years in prison. Hakim Jamal is murdered in 1973. The murders of both Bambas and Guy Singer are never solved. The loot taken from the robbery exceeds that of the Great Train Robbery at £4 million. Over 100 safe deposit holders refuse to identify their losses as most of them are criminals. A disclaimer at the end of the film ironically remarks that the names of many of the persons involved in the film have been changed to protect the guilty.

Cast

Historical background
The film is in part based on historical facts about the Baker Street robbery. A gang tunnelled into a branch of Lloyds Bank at the junction of Baker Street and Marylebone Road in London on the night of 11 September 1971 and robbed the safe deposit boxes that were stored in the vault. The robbers had rented a leather goods shop named Le Sac two doors down from the bank, and tunnelled approximately 40 feet (12 metres), passing under the Chicken Inn restaurant that was located between the shop and the bank.  The tunnelling took three weeks, working on weekends.

Ham radio operator Robert Rowlands overheard conversations between the robbers and their rooftop lookout. He contacted police and tape-recorded the conversations, which were subsequently made public. The film includes lines recorded by Rowlands, such as the lookout's comment that "money may be your god, but it's not mine, and I'm fucking off."

The film's producers said that they have a source, identified in press reports as George McIndoe, who was an executive producer. McIndoe claimed that he had talked with two of the gang, who even visited the film set. The film's plot includes a fictional issue of a D-Notice by MI5, requesting no further press reports on grounds of national security because a safe deposit box holding sexually compromising pictures of Princess Margaret. The possible connection to Michael X is  based on material from McIndoe, who said he had spoken to two men who claimed they were involved robbers. The Daily Mirror interviewed a convicted robber who claims to be a perpetrator, and he indicated that embarrassing photos were found but deliberately left behind for the police, including child pornography. The film-makers acknowledged that they made up the character Martine, and David Denby wrote in The New Yorker that it is "impossible to say how much of the film's story is true".

The fictional character of Lew Vogel may allude to pornographer and racketeer Bernie Silver, a major figure in Soho in the 1960s and early 1970s who was imprisoned in 1975 for the 1956 murder of Tommy "Scarface" Smithson, and also to later events surrounding his associate pornographer James Humphreys. The Sunday People published photographs in 1972 of Commander Kenneth Drury, the head of the Metropolitan Police Flying Squad, spending a luxurious two-week holiday with Humphreys in Cyprus, and a police raid on Humphreys' house uncovered a diary cataloguing itemised payments to 17 police officers. Humphreys was imprisoned for eight years in 1974 for wounding his wife's former lover. He then turned Queen's Evidence, testifying against some of Scotland Yard's most senior officers in two major corruption trials in 1977, for which he received a Royal Pardon and was released from prison. In 1994, Humphreys was imprisoned for 12 months for living off the earnings of prostitutes.

The introduction of Michael X's character showing him leading a landlord locked in a slave collar is based on a historical incident. A passing glance at a photo of John Lennon found in Michael X's safety deposit box is inspired by Lennon's support for Michael X's "Black House" headquarters depicted in the film, and Lennon posting his bail.

On 21 February, 2023, the American History Channel television series "History's Greatest Heists" (hosted by Pierce Brosnan) used dramatized re-enactments to reveal the stranger-than-fiction truth surrounding events before, during, and after the heist.  This included the real name of the heist's ringleader, Anthony Gavin.

Production

Part of the filming took place on location at the offices of Websters, 136 Baker Street, where the rooftops were used for lookout locations. The exterior scenes of the bank and adjacent shops were done at Pinewood Studios on a specially constructed set of Baker Street, to retain an authentic feel of the period and to allow for greater control. This partial set was extended using visual effects.

The production also shot on location inside the Aldwych Underground station, and at Paddington station as itself. The crew used Chatham Historic Dockyard to shoot the sequence at the side entrance of Paddington, where the final showdown between Terry and Lew Vogel takes place.

Reception

Critical response 
The review aggregator Rotten Tomatoes reports that 80% of 148 critics gave the film a positive review, with an average rating of 6.8/10. The website's critics consensus reads: "Well cast and crisply directed, The Bank Job is a thoroughly entertaining British heist thriller." Metacritic reports the film has a weighted average score of 69 out of 100 based on 32 critics, indicating "generally favorable reviews". Audiences polled by CinemaScore graded the film an average "B+" on an A+ to F scale.

Box office 
The Bank Job grossed $30.1 million in the United States and Canada, as well as $36.1 million in other territories (including $8.1 million in the UK), for a worldwide total of $66.1 million.

The film opened at No. 4 in North America and grossed US$5.9 million in 1,603 cinemas in its opening weekend.

References

External links

 
 
 
 
 

2008 films
2008 crime thriller films
2000s heist films
British crime thriller films
British heist films
British docudrama films
Films about bank robbery
Films set in 1971
Films set in London
Films set in Trinidad and Tobago
Murder in films
Atlas Entertainment films
Lionsgate films
Paramount Pictures films
Relativity Media films
Films directed by Roger Donaldson
Films produced by Charles Roven
Films scored by J. Peter Robinson
Films with screenplays by Dick Clement
Films with screenplays by Ian La Frenais
2000s English-language films
2000s British films